Michel Spiro (born 24 February 1946 in Roanne, Loire, France) is a French physicist.

Biography 
Michel Spiro attended the high school Jean-Puy de Roanne. Spiro obtained the baccalauréat in 1963, with a specialisation in elementary mathematics. After this, he attended the school
Lycée Louis-le-Grand  to prepare his entry exam at the École polytechnique. He completed his graduate studies in theoretical physics in 1969. 
 
He joined the French Alternative Energies and Atomic Energy Commission (CEA) in 1970, as an engineer. He was promoted to the position of director of the Particle Physics Section of the Department of Astrophysics, Particle Physics, Nuclear Physics and Associated Instrumentation (DAPNIA ) in 1991 and led the section until 1999. He became chargé de mission of the CEA and assistant scientific director in Centre national de la recherche scientifique (CNRS), responsible for astroparticle physics and neutrinos. He took over the leadership of DAPNIA in 2002. From 2003 to 2010 he was appointed director of Institut national de physique nucléaire et de physique des particules (IN2P3) in CNRS.

Spiro obtained his PhD  from University of Paris-Sud, Orsay in 1976. His early research in particle physics led him, as a member of the UA1 experiment, to participate in the discovery of the intermediate bosons W and Z.
He then turned to study particles from the cosmos by participating in the GALLEX solar neutrino detection experiment.
He became then the spokesperson of the microlensing search experiment EROS(Experience de Recherche d'Objets Sombres).

From 1983 to 1999, Professor Spiro lectured quantum mechanics, then stellar equilibrium and evolution and finally energy and environment at the École Polytechnique.

From 2010 to 2013 he was President of CERN Council. His presidency overlapped with the start of LHC physics. Since then Spiro helds the position as research director emeritus at the CEA.

Michel Spiro was president of the French Physical Society from 2016 to 2017 and president-elect for International Union of Pure and Applied Physics (IUPAP) as of 2018. In October 2019 Spiro was asked to replace IUPAP president Kennedy J. Reed who wanted to step down for personal reasons.

In June 2020, Michel Spiro was appointed chair of the CERN and Society Foundation Board, a foundation to support and promote the mission of CERN, the European Organization for Nuclear Research, and disseminate its benefits to the wider public.

Spiro chairs the steering committee of the International Year of Basic Sciences for Sustainable Development (IYBSSD2022). The International Year was proclaimed by the 76th session of the United Nations General Assembly 2 December 2021. IYBSSD will begin mid-2022 and extend until mid-2023.

Awards and honors 
  Officer of the Legion of Honour (2021), Knight (2004)
  Officer of the National Order of Merit (France) (2008)

 1983 : Joliot-Curie Prize of the French Physical Society
 1985 : Thibaud Prize of the Academy of Lyon
 1995 : Philip Morris Research Prize shared with M. Cribier and D. Vignaud for solar neutrinos (GALLEX)
 1999 : Félix Robin Prize of the Société Française de Physique
 2000 : Prize of the l'Association française pour le rayonnement international
 2015 : Fellow of the European Physical Society 
 2018 : Prix A. Lagarrigue
 2020 : Honorary doctor of the Joint Institute for Nuclear Research

Works and publications

Scientific articles 
The database INSPIRE-HEP has recorded more than 200 scientific articles signed by Spiro.

Articles of special importance 
Experimental Observation of Isolated Large Transverse Energy Electrons with Associated Missing Energy at s**(1/2) =540-GeV. UA1 Collaboration (G.Arnison et al.). Feb 1983. 31 pp. Phys. Lett. B122 (1983) 103-116 DOI: 10.1016/0370-2693(83)91177-2
Experimental Particle Physics Without Accelerators. J. Rich, D. Lloyd Owen, M. Spiro (Saclay). 1987. 126 pp. Phys. Rep. 151 (1987) 239-364 DOI: 10.1016/0370-1573(87)90055-X
Search for superheavy hydrogen in sea water. M. Spiro, B. Pichard, J. Rich, J.P. Soirat, S. Zylberajch (DAPNIA, Saclay), G. Grynberg, F. Trehin, P. Verkerk, Pierre Fayet (École Normale Superieure), M.E. Goldberg (Pasteur Inst., Paris). 1990. Les Arcs 1990, Proceedings, New and exotic phenomena '90 489-498''']Evidence for gravitational microlensing by dark objects in the galactic halo. EROS collaboration E. Aubourg, P. Bareyre, S. Brehin, M. Gros, M. Lachieze-Rey, B. Laurent, E. Lesquoy, C. Magneville, A. Milsztain, L. Moscoso (DAPNIA, Saclay) et al.. Oct 1993. 3 pp. Nature 365 (1993) 623-625'' [https://doi.org/10.1038/365623a0 DOI: 10.1038/365623a0

Selected books

References

1946 births
Chevaliers of the Légion d'honneur
École Polytechnique alumni
Academic staff of École Polytechnique
French physicists
Living people
Lycée Louis-le-Grand alumni
Officers of the Ordre national du Mérite
People associated with CERN
Presidents of the International Union of Pure and Applied Physics
Presidents of the Société Française de Physique